Bodo Otto House is located in the Mickleton section of East Greenwich Township, Gloucester County, New Jersey, United States. The house was built in 1766 and was added to the National Register of Historic Places on December 12, 1976.

See also
Bodo Otto
National Register of Historic Places listings in Gloucester County, New Jersey

References

Houses completed in 1766
Houses on the National Register of Historic Places in New Jersey
Houses in Gloucester County, New Jersey
National Register of Historic Places in Gloucester County, New Jersey
New Jersey Register of Historic Places
East Greenwich Township, New Jersey